Len Deighton (born 18 February 1929) is an English author known for his novels, works of military history, screenplays and cookery writing. He had a varied career, including as a pastry cook, waiter, co-editor of a magazine, teacher and air steward before writing his first novel in 1962: The IPCRESS File. He continued to produce what his biographer John Reilly considers "stylish, witty, well-crafted novels" in spy fiction, including three trilogies and a prequel featuring Bernard Samson.

Deighton authored two television scripts, the first of which was Long Past Glory in 1963; he also wrote a film script, Oh! What a Lovely War (1969). His long-held interest in cooking—his mother had been a professional chef and instilled a love for cuisine in her son—led to an illustrated cookery column in the Sunday newspaper, The Observer, for two years. The work was collected into two later books, Len Deighton's Action Cook Book and Où est le garlic (both 1965); he subsequently wrote several other cookery books. Deighton has produced several other works of non-fiction, including a study of the assassination of John F. Kennedy, a history of the airship, Second World War military history and a short e-book about James Bond.

Novels

Miscellaneous
Several of Deighton's works have been adapted for screen: the films The Ipcress File (1965), Funeral in Berlin (1966), Billion Dollar Brain (1967) and Spy Film (1976). In 1988 Granada Television produced the miniseries Game, Set and Match based on his trilogy of the same name.

Non-fiction

Notes and references

Notes

References

Sources

External links

 
 Works by Len Deighton at Internet Archive

Bibliographies by writer
Bibliographies of British writers
Works by Len Deighton